X-Ology: The Best of X-Raided is the first compilation album released by rapper, X-Raided. It was released on August 14, 2001, through Black Market Records and was produced by X-Raided, Brotha Lynch Hung, Sicx, Big Hollis and KG.

Track listing
"White Man's Burden"- 4:14 
"Unforgiven"- 3:30 
"Duece-5 to Life"- 4:40 
"As the World Spins"- 4:32 
"The Hole"- 3:42 
"Bitch Killa"- 3:54 
"Macaframa"- 4:52 
"Here We Come"- 2:14 
"Where You At"- 2:59 
"Lord Have Mercy"- 4:01 
"Hold On"- 4:11 
"Wit a Mask On"- 6:23 
"Still Shooting"- 4:14 
"Money, Power, Respect"- 3:37 
"Misanthrophy"- 5:39 
"Trial by Fury"- 4:13 
"I Ain't Dead Yet"- 4:47 
"Write What I See"- 1:51

References

X-Raided albums
2001 compilation albums
Albums produced by Big Hollis